is a passenger railway station located in the town of Shimanto, Takaoka District, Kōchi, Japan. It is operated by Shikoku Railway Company (JR Shikoku).

Lines
Tōkawa Station is served by the Yodo Line, and is numbered "G32".

Layout
The station consists of a single island platform located on the side of a hill. The island platform is accessed by means of a stairs from underneath, There is no station building, but only a weather shelter on the platform itself. The station is unattended,

History
The station opened on 1 March 1974. With the privatization of JNR on 1 April 1987, the station came under the control of JR Shikoku.

Surrounding area
Shimanto Town Hall - Towa Branch (Former Towa Village Office)
Shimanto Municipal Sogawa Elementary School
Shimanto Municipal Sogawa Junior High School

See also
 List of railway stations in Japan
 Togawa Station, a station in Aomori Prefecture with the same Japanese name

References

External links
Station timetable

Railway stations in Kōchi Prefecture
Yodo Line
Railway stations in Japan opened in 1974
Shimanto, Kōchi (town)